Ghislain de Diesbach de Belleroche (born 6 August 1931 in Le Havre) is a French writer and biographer.

Works 
1960: Iphigénie en Thuringe : nouvelles, Julliard, Paris
1962: Un joli train de vie, Julliard
1964: Favre de Thierrens, essai biographique, Émile-Paul, Paris ; Preface by André Bonnefous, 1 vol. in-12, 219 pp. and 26 illustrations hors-texte.
1966: George III, Berger-Levrault; Paris
1969: Le tour de Jules Verne en quatre-vingts livres, Julliard; reprint under the title Le tour de Jules Verne en 80 livres, Perrin, 2002, 
1972: Le Gentilhomme de notre temps : manuel des bonnes manières, nouveau traité de savoir-vivre, Hachette Littérature, Paris
1972: Service de France, Émile-Paul
1975: Histoire de l'émigration : 1789-1814, Bernard Grasset, Paris, 
1978: Necker ou la Faillite de la vertu, Perrin, 
1979: with Robert Grouvel, Échec à Bonaparte : Louis-Edmond de Phélippeaux, 1767-1799, Perrin
1979: Ferdinand Bac : 1859-1952
1981: Aix-Marseille 1949-1955 (souvenirs) Paris
1983: Madame de Staël, Perrin, 
1986: La Princesse Bibesco : 1886-1973, Perrin, series "Terres des femmes", 
1988: La Double vie de la duchesse Colonna : 1836-1879 : la Chimère Bleue, Perrin, series "Terres des femmes", . Reprint by éditions de Penthes, Prégny-Genève, 2015
1991: Proust, Perrin, 
1993: Philippe Jullian : un esthète aux enfers, Plon, 
1995: Chateaubriand, Perrin, 
1996: Au bon patriote : nouvelles, Plon, 
1998: Ferdinand de Lesseps, Perrin, 
1999: Sophie Rostopchine, comtesse de Ségur, Perrin, 
2001: Un lieu tout plein de gaîté, Poly print, Paris, 
2001: Louis de Diesbach 1893-1982, essai biographique, Paris, Hugues de Diesbach et Poly Print Editions
2002: Un prince 1900 : Ferdinand Bac, Perrin, 
2003: L'abbé Mugnier : le confesseur du Tout-Paris, Perrin, 
2005: Une éducation manquée : souvenirs, 1931-1949, Perrin, 
2007: Petit Dictionnaire des idées mal reçues, Via Romana, Versailles 180 p. 
2009: Une éducation manquée : souvenirs 1931-1948, Via Romana, (édition augmentée) 
2009: Gare Saint-Charles : souvenirs 1949-1957, Via Romana, 
2009: Richard Burton, P.U.F., Paris,
2010: Le goût d'autrui : portraits anecdotiques, Via Romana, 
2013: Un début à Paris : souvenirs 1957-1966, Via Romana, 
2014: Nouveau savoir-vivre : éloge de la bonne éducation, Perrin,

Honours 
1962: Prix Cazes brasserie Lipp for Un joli train de vie, Julliard
1992: Grand Prix de la biographie of the Académie française for Proust, Perrin, 1991, 
1995: Prix du Pen Club français
1999: Prix des Ambassadeurs for Ferdinand de Lesseps, Perrin, 1998, 
1999: Prix Charles Garnier for Ferdinand de Lesseps, Perrin, 1998, 
2000: Prix Renaissance for le Petit dictionnaire des idées mal reçues, Via Romana, Versailles, 2007

Family 
The Diesbach family is of Swiss origin, from the canton of Berne. At the time of the Reformation, part of the family remained Catholic and, having to leave Bern, took refuge in Fribourg. The Diesbachs have supplied a large number of officers to the foreign service, notably in Austria, France, Poland, Sardinia, and Naples.

See also 
  (1452-1527).

External links 
 Ghislain de Diesbach, Madame de Staël (compte rendu) on Persée
 Ghislain de Diesbach, un gentilhomme de notre temps on Archaïon
 Le Nouveau savoir-vivre de Ghislain de Diesbacc on Lintern@ute
 Ghislain de Diesbach : Richard Burton video on INA.fr

20th-century French writers
21st-century French writers
French biographers
Prix Goncourt de la Biographie winners
Writers from Le Havre
1931 births
Living people